Mujibur Rahman is a Bangladesh Jamaat-e-Islami politician. He was elected a member of parliament from Rajshahi-1 in 1986.

Career 
Mujibur Rahman is the central Naeb amir of Bangladesh Jamaat-e-Islami. He was elected a member of parliament from Rajshahi-1 in 1986 Bangladeshi general election. He is one of renowned Islamic Scholar and writer of many islamic books.

References 

People from Rajshahi District
Bangladesh Jamaat-e-Islami politicians
3rd Jatiya Sangsad members